Ondřej Poživil (born April 22, 1987) is a Czech-German professional ice hockey defenceman playing for Lausitzer Füchse.

Poživil played 41 games in the Czech Extraliga for HC Litvínov. On August 23, 2012, he left the Czech Republic to sign for the Manchester Phoenix of the English Premier Ice Hockey League On April 19, 2013, Poživil moved to France to join Scorpions de Mulhouse of the Ligue Magnus.

On October 8, 2015, Poživil joined EV Landshut of the 2nd Bundesliga. On May 6, 2016, he joined ESV Kaufbeuren and a year later on April 12, 2017, he joined the Ravensburg Towerstars. After two season with the Towerstars, Poživil signed for Lausitzer Füchse on May 8, 2019.

Poživil played for the Czech Republic in the 2005 IIHF World U18 Championships and the 2007 World Junior Ice Hockey Championships

His older brother Lukáš Poživil also played professional ice hockey.

References

External links

1987 births
Living people
Czech ice hockey defencemen
Stadion Hradec Králové players
LHK Jestřábi Prostějov players
EV Landshut players
Lausitzer Füchse players
HC Litvínov players
Manchester Phoenix players
HC Most players
Piráti Chomutov players
Ravensburg Towerstars players
Scorpions de Mulhouse players
Sportovní Klub Kadaň players
People from Litvínov
HC Tábor players
HC Vrchlabí players
Sportspeople from the Ústí nad Labem Region
Czech expatriate sportspeople in France
Czech expatriate sportspeople in England
Expatriate ice hockey players in England
Expatriate ice hockey players in France
Czech expatriate ice hockey players in Germany
Naturalized citizens of Germany